Çiğli Air Base  is a military airport near Çiğli, a metropolitan district of the city of İzmir in İzmir Province, Turkey.

It served as İzmir's airport until the opening of the Adnan Menderes Airport, situated south of the metropolitan area.

Facilities 

References

External links
 
 

Airports in Turkey
Buildings and structures in İzmir Province
Turkish Air Force bases
Military in İzmir Province